Jacaranda Software was an Australian developer and publisher of educational computer games for children. It was based in Brisbane, Australia and published under the leadership of John Collins. The team worked as a department of Jacaranda-Wiley; the Australian imprint of American publishing company, Wiley. While it was considered initially as an experimental venture, it proved to be profitable from its first year through to its closure in the early 1990s. Jacaranda Software released titles for a range of computer systems, including the Apple II, Commodore 64, Macintosh, Microbee and BBC Micro. 

After the department closed, former employees David Smith, Bruce Mitchell, and Steve Luckett continued to write software for schools, under the name Greygum Software. They bought remaining stock, rights, and equipment from Jacaranda. Popular Jacaranda titles included Goldfields, Kraken: a deep sea quest, Desert Quest and Crossing the Mountains.

Greygum Software closed in 2018 due to the retirement of its owners.

Releases

External links 
 Greygum Software - stockists of several former Jacaranda Software titles
 Using Computers in the Primary School by Rosemary Guttormsen (1987 Apple Computer Australia) - Apple educational handbook mentions Jacaranda Software among others

References 

Educational games
Defunct technology companies of Australia